São Félix do Araguaia Airport  is the airport serving São Félix do Araguaia, Brazil.

Airlines and destinations

Access

See also

List of airports in Brazil

References

External links

Airports in Mato Grosso